Braunsia is a genus of succulent plant in the family Aizoaceae, indigenous to the Western Cape province in South Africa.

The plant only grows to 20 cm (8 inches), its opposite leaves grow in pairs, its flowers are either pink or magenta. the plant grows slowly it only needs water in late fall of early spring, in other seasons its preferable for it to be kept dry.

References

Aizoaceae
Aizoaceae genera
Taxa named by Martin Heinrich Gustav Schwantes